Wayside is a small unincorporated community in Lynn County, Texas, United States. Today, the community is best described as a ghost town with only a few farms and ranches scattered across the area.

Geography
In the state of Texas, there are six small communities that share the name Wayside. On the high plains of the Llano Estacado is Wayside (Armstrong County), Wayside (Roberts County), and Wayside (Lynn County).  The other three communities, which lie in Central Texas, include Wayside (Bastrop County), Wayside (Wood County) and Wayside (Panola County).

See also
List of ghost towns in Texas
Farm to Market Road 400
Caprock Escarpment

References

External links

Unincorporated communities in Texas
Populated places in Lynn County, Texas